Rory O'More is a 1911 American silent film produced by Kalem Company. It was directed by Sidney Olcott and Robert G. Vignola, with Gene Gauntier and Jack J. Clark in the leading roles. It is based on the novel and play by Samuel Lover. While the historical Rory O'More took part in the Irish Rebellion of 1641, the film places the story in the context of the Irish Rebellion of 1798.

Cast
 Gene Gauntier as Kathleen
 Jack J. Clark as Rory O'More
 Arthur Donaldson as Father O'Brien
 Robert Vignola as Black Williams
 J.P. McGowan as British Officer
 Anna Clark as Rory's Mother

Production notes
The film was shot in Beaufort, County Kerry, Ireland, during summer of 1911.

References

 Michel Derrien, Aux origines du cinéma irlandais: Sidney Olcott, le premier oeil, TIR 2013.  
 Denis Condon, Touristic Work and Pleasure: The Kalem Company in Killarney

External links

 Rory O'More website dedicated to Sidney Olcott
Restored film at YouTube

1911 films
Silent American drama films
American silent short films
Films set in Ireland
Films shot in Ireland
Films directed by Sidney Olcott
1911 short films
1911 drama films
American black-and-white films
1910s American films